The Asen dynasty (Asenevtsi) founded and ruled a medieval Bulgarian state, called in modern historiography the Second Bulgarian Empire, between 1185 and 1280.

The Asen dynasty rose as the leaders of Bulgaria after a rebellion against the Byzantine Empire at the turn of the year 1185/1186 caused by the increase in the Imperial taxes.

Early rulers from the Asen dynasty (particularly Kaloyan) referred to themselves as "Emperors of Bulgarians and Vlachs". Later rulers, especially the successful Ivan Asen II, styled themselves "Tsars (Emperors) of Bulgarians and Romans".

Some members of the Asen family entered Byzantine service in the thirteenth to fourteenth centuries. The name also occurs as a family name in modern Greek, and could go back to the same name. Their origin is obscure.

Origins

The origins of the dynasty, especially the ethnic background of the three Asen brothers (Teodor I Peter IV, Ivan Asen I and Kaloyan) are still a source of much controversy, debated among historians. There are three main hypotheses regarding their origins:
 Cuman origin, as some of the names in the dynasty, including Asen, are derived from Cuman language, as well as the close ties to the Cumans, such as intermarriage (including Kaloyan's wife), immediate entourage and allies. Groups of Cumans settled and mingled with the local population in many regions of the Balkans between the 10th and 13th centuries and founded also other successive Bulgarian dynasties (Terterids and Shishmanids).  
 Bulgarian origin, a view that is common among the Bulgarian historians who reckon that all native sources (from the 13th century) use predominantly the terms Bulgaria, Bulgarians and Bulgarian, the Slavic names like Ivanko (relative and murderer of Ivan Asen I), Boril and Slav, that tsar Kaloyan claimed provenance from the old Bulgarian rulers and his state from the First Bulgarian Empire and declares himself a Bulgarian avenger, adopting the moniker the Romanslayer by analogy with the emperor Basil II the Bulgar Slayer and shows cruelty to the Byzantines as revenge for the murdered and blinded Bulgarians. 
 Vlach origin, a view supported by many contemporary sources and Romanian scholars who base their claims on Western Crusade chronicles, and letters between Pope Innocent III and Kaloyan.

In their own administrative documents and correspondence, the three rulers viewed themselves as descendants and successors of the Bulgarian Tsars Samuil, Peter I and Simeon I, and the state they founded as a continuation of the First Bulgarian Empire. However, this could be just a way to proclaim their legitimacy for the throne of the Empire.

In a correspondence, of 1199, the Pope talks about the "Roman descent" of Kaloyan. However, considering the actual text says Nos autem audito quod de nobili urbis Romae prosapia progenitores tui originem traxerint ("We heard that your forefathers come from a noble family from the city of Rome"), it is usually dismissed as simply a hidden compliment of the Pope to Kaloyan.

Pope Innocent III in his letter to the Bulgarian King Kaloyan (Calojoannes) in 1204 addressed him "King of Bulgarians and Vlachs" (rex Bulgarorum et Blachorum); in answering the Pope, John called himself imperator omnium Bulgarorum et Blachorum ("Emperor of all Bulgarians and Vlachs'), but signed himself imperator Bulgariae Calojoannes ("Emperor Kaloyan of Bulgaria"); besides, the archbishop of Veliko Tarnovo called himself totius Bulgariae et Blaciae Primas ("Primate of all Bulgaria and Vlachia").

Ivan Asen II styles himselve “Tsar and sovereign of the Bulgarians“ and “Tsar of Bulgarians and Greeks”.

The Bulgarian historiography negate, while the Romanian highlight the role of the Vlachs in the uprising. However, the scientific debate reflects the nationalistic rivality from the 19-20th century, which did not exist in the 12-13th century. Vlachs and Bulgarian Slavs jointly inhabited Bulgaria, and both groups in sufferance were united against the common cause under a leader, regardless of the leader "race". The Asen brothers were associated with the Vlach population of the mountainous regions around Trnovo, Niketas Choniates recorded Vlach shamans during revolt exhibition, but nevertheless of their ethnicity, it was a joint venture of the Bulgarians, Vlachs and Cumans.

Etymology 
The name of the dynasty comes from one of the brothers, namely Asen I. The etymology is most likely of Cuman Turkic origin, derived from "esen" which meant "safe, sound, healthy" and the Belgun nickname seems to be derived from Turkic "bilgün", which meant "wise". Further support to this connection can be found in the charters of the Great Lavra of Mt. Athos from the end of the 12th century, which mention the monastery's problems with some of the Cuman stratiotes, where "Asen" is listed as the name of one of those Cumans.

Other study shows that the only name that makes sense is änish ("descent") and the word can be found almost exclusively in the languages of the Kipchak Turks

Bulgarian Emperors from the Asen dynasty

Byzantine branch
The Asens in Byzantium largely descend from Ivan Asen III, who ruled briefly as Emperor of Bulgaria before fleeing to Constantinople as Ivaylo's uprising was gaining momentum in 1280. A despotes under Michael VIII Palaiologos, Ivan Asen III had already been married to the Byzantine Emperor's eldest daughter, Irene Palaiologina. The couple's five sons and two daughters were the progenitors of one of the highest-regarded Byzantine noble families of their time, along with the Palaiologoi. Among the Byzantine Asens, three bore the title of despotes, three that of sebastokrator, two panhypersebastos, one was a megas doux and two were titled megas primikerios. In Greek, the male form of the family name is rendered as Ἀσάνης (Asanis) and the female as Ασανίνα (Asanina).

A smaller branch descends from Elena Asenina of Bulgaria, wife of Nicaean Emperor Theodore II Laskaris.

The Asens of Byzantium intermarried with other prominent noble dynasties, including the Kantakouzenos, Doukas, Laskaris, Tornikios, Raoul and Zaccaria families. Notable members of the Asen family in the Byzantine Empire include:

 Andronikos Asen, epitropos of the Morea (1316-1322)
 Irene Asanina, Empress Consort of John VI Kantakouzenos (1347-1354)
 Matthew Asen Kantakouzenos, Co-Emperor of Byzantium (1353-1357)
 Matthew Palaiologos Asen, Lord of Corinth (1454-1458)

The last tsar of Bulgaria, Simeon II is descended from this branch via the Kantakouzenoi, Brankovici families.

Byzantine Asens elsewhere
From Byzantium, the Asens spread as far as Frankish Greece, the Principality of Theodoro, the Principality of Moldavia, the Kingdom of Naples and the Kingdom of Aragon.

 Eudoxia Laskarina Asanina (1248-1311), Nicaean princess, Countess of Ventimiglia and Tende and nun in Aragon 
 Helena Asanina Kantakouzene, Dowager Countess of Salona (1380-1394)
 Andronikos Asen Zaccaria, Prince of Achaea (before 1386-1401)
 Thomas Asen Palaiologos, exile in Naples and ktetor
 Maria Asanina Palaiologina, Princess Consort of Moldavia (1472-1477)

See also
 Ashina tribe
 History of Bulgaria
 List of Bulgarian monarchs

Notes

References
 
 
 
 Vasary, Istvan (2005) "Cumans and Tatars", Cambridge University Press: pp. 34–42
 Stephenson, Paul (2000) "Byzantium's Balkan Frontier — A Political Study of the Northern Balkans, 900–1204" pp. 289–300
 History of the Byzantine Empire, A. A. Vasiliev 1935
 
 Stelian Brezeanu, Istoria Imperiului Bizantin, Bucuresti, MERONIA, 2007

External link

 
History of Eastern Romance people
Bulgarian noble families